Sir Piers Jacobs  (27 May 1933 – 23 September 1999) was Financial Secretary of Hong Kong from 1986 to 1991, a period that included the 1987 market crash, when he oversaw the closure of the stock exchange and notably refused to bail out the Bank of Credit and Commerce International. He also was Secretary for Economic Services from 1982 to 1986. 

A solicitor by profession, Jacobs held a number of senior corporate positions, including in later life: senior vice-chairman and director of CLP Holdings, chairman and director of Sir Elly Kadoorie and Sons, and chairman of the Kadoorie Farm and Botanic Garden Corporation.

Personal life, and death
Born in the United Kingdom, Jacobs was married with one daughter. He died in Hong Kong on 23 September 1999, survived by his wife and daughter.

References

1933 births
1999 deaths
Financial Secretaries of Hong Kong
Government officials of Hong Kong
Hong Kong people of British descent
Knights Commander of the Order of the British Empire
HK LegCo Members 1985–1988